The Athlone to Mullingar Cycleway (also known as Old Rail Trail) is a long-distance cycling and walking trail in County Westmeath, which forms a section of the Dublin-Galway Greenway. It is a 42 kilometres long rail-trail over the disused Athlone-Mullingar rail line beginning in Athlone and ending in Mullingar.

History

The route was originally opened  1850 as a railway line by the Midland Great Western Railway and was the first to reach Athlone from Dublin.  The line was closed  1987 with trains using the former Great Southern and Western Railway line to reach Athlone.

The Moate-Garrycastle section was officially opened by Taoiseach Enda Kenny in October 2015. In September 2015 the Westmeath Independent reported that the greenway could provide a "€15m boost" to the local economy.

The section was extended up to Ballymahon road (White gates) in December 2016, with plans to eventually extend into Athlone town.

As of 2015, plans by a community development organisation in Kilbeggan, County Westmeath, were underway to connect the Greenway to the Offaly Cycleways at Kilbeggan with a greenway to Tullamore, County Offaly. Work was planned to begin by summer 2016.

A new bridge to cross the River Shannon in Athlone was allocated €8.1m funding and was planned to begin construction in June 2021.

Parts of railway not greenway should reopening to trains on February 10th 2023 All Ireland Rail Review on reopening and restoring the service was looked at.

Access points
The following is a list of the access points to the cycleway.

See also 
 EuroVelo

References

External links
 Map of the cycleway

Dublin-Galway Greenway
Geography of County Westmeath
Tourist attractions in County Westmeath
Rail trails in the Republic of Ireland